The 2006–07 Iowa State Cyclones men's basketball team represents Iowa State University during the 2006–07 NCAA Division I men's basketball season. The Cyclones were coached by Greg McDermott, who was in his 1st season. They played their home games at Hilton Coliseum in Ames, Iowa and competed in the Big 12 Conference.

Previous season
The Cyclones finished 16-14, 6-10 in Big 12 play to finish 8th the regular season conference standings.  They lost to Colorado in the first round of the Big 12 tournament.

On March 17, 2006 it was announced that Wayne Morgan and his staff would be fired by the university.  While lack of results played into the decision there were other contributing factors.  While Morgan was a high level recruiter, on the court success did not follow as it should have.  In addition, Morgan and his staff had used a company called 'D1 Scheduling' to schedule games in the past seasons.  There were allegations that money was being exchanged for recruits.

On March 21, 2006 it was announced that Greg McDermott, then head coach of the UNI Panthers, would be hired as head coach of the Cyclones.

Offseason departures

Recruiting

Roster

Schedule and results

|-
!colspan=12 style=""|Exhibition
|-

|-

|-
!colspan=12 style=""|Regular Season
|-

|-

|-

|-

|-

|-

|-

|-

|-

|-

|-

|-

|-

|-

|-

|-

|-

|-

|-

|-

|-

|-

|-

|-

|-

|-

|-

|-

|-

|-

|-
!colspan=12 style=""|Big 12 Tournament
|-

|-

Awards and honors

All-Conference Selections

Mike Taylor (basketball) (Honorable Mention)

Freshman All-American

Mike Taylor (basketball) (2004)

Academic All-Big 12 First Team

Ross Marsden (2007)
Jeff Bergstrom (2007)

Ralph A. Olsen Award

Mike Taylor (basketball) (2007)

References

Iowa State Cyclones men's basketball seasons
Iowa State
Iowa State Cyc
Iowa State Cyc